Vincent Faucheux (born 29 January 1982) is a French lightweight rower. He won a gold medal at the 2004 World Rowing Championships in Banyoles with the lightweight men's eight.

References

1982 births
Living people
French male rowers
World Rowing Championships medalists for France
21st-century French people